Singo Lane is a residential neighbourhood in Lyari, located in the Karachi South district of Karachi, Pakistan.

There are several ethnic groups in Singo Lane including Muhajirs, Sindhis, Punjabis, Kashmiris, Seraikis, Pakhtuns, Balochs, Memons, Bohras,  Ismailis, etc. Over 99% of the population is Muslim. The population of Lyari Town is estimated to be over 
600,000 in 2005.

References

External links 
 Karachi website - Archived

Neighbourhoods of Karachi
Lyari Town